Nueva Guadalupe is a municipality in the San Miguel department of El Salvador with nearly 9000 inhabitants in 2018.

Municipalities of the San Miguel Department (El Salvador)